South Division One may refer to:

 South Division One (shinty), a Scottish men's shinty division
 NIHL South Division 1, an English men's ice hockey division

See also
 South Division (disambiguation)
 South Division Two (disambiguation)